is a railway station in the city of Katagami, Akita, Japan, operated by JR East.

Lines
Ugo-Iizuka Station is served by the Ōu Main Line, and is located 322.2 kilometers from the starting point of the line at Fukushima Station.

Station layout
The station has one side platform and one island platform, serving three tracks, connected to the station building by a footbridge. The station is staffed.

Platforms

History

Ugo-Iizuka Station opened on 17 November 1927. With the privatization of Japanese National Railways (JNR) on 1 April 1987, the station came under the control of JR East.

Passenger statistics
In fiscal 2018, the station was used by an average of 106 passengers daily (boarding passengers only).

Surrounding area
 Iidagawa Post Office

See also
 List of Railway Stations in Japan

References

External links

  

Railway stations in Japan opened in 1927
Railway stations in Akita Prefecture
Ōu Main Line
Katagami, Akita